Louis Aucoc (21 September 1850 Paris – 10 December 1932 Paris), was a leading Parisian art nouveau jeweller and goldsmith, working with his father and brother André.

Biography
The Aucoc family firm at 6 Rue de la Paix was established in Paris in 1821 and was patronised by the house of King Louis Philippe, the  House of Orléans, Napoleon III and Empress Eugenie. The shop is mentioned in the first chapter of The Lady of the Camellias (French: La Dame aux camélias, published in 1848).

From 1874 to 1876, René Lalique was an apprentice to Aucoc.  Lalique would later become a defining figure in the art nouveau movement.

The business left the hands of the Aucoc family in 1932.

Louis Aucoc married Micheline Louise Isaiah Rondeleux on 4 June 1872  and had three children - Georges, René and a daughter who married André la Ferté.

References

1850 births
1932 deaths
Art Nouveau designers
French jewellery designers
French jewellers
Artists from Paris